Trethowan is a Cornish surname, found both in Cornwall and amongst members of the Cornish diaspora. People with the name include:

 Anthony Trethowan (1945–2015), Australian politician
 Arthur Trethowan (1863–1937), Australian politician
 Ian Trethowan (1922–1990), British television executive
 Illtyd Trethowan (1907–1993), British religious philosopher
 John Trethowan (born 1936), Australian rules footballer
 Pat Trethowan (born 1941), Australian rules footballer
 Rebecca Trethowan (born 1985), New Zealand rugby union player
 Perry Trethowan, a fictional detective in a series of books by Robert Barnard
Sir William Trethowan  British professor of psychiatry, Birmingham University

See also
 Trethowan's sign

Cornish-language surnames